John Smith (21 December 1927 – August 2000) was an English footballer who played as a midfielder for Liverpool in The Football League. Smith played amateur football for Bromborough Pool before he signed for Liverpool in 1951. He made 27 appearances in each of his first two seasons at the club and scored on his debut in a 2–0 against Derby County He only featured 3 times during the 1953–54 season when the club were relegated to the Second Division. He was transferred to Torquay United at the end of the season.

References

1927 births
English footballers
Liverpool F.C. players
Torquay United F.C. players
English Football League players
2000 deaths
Association football midfielders